(KDO)2-lipid IVA (2-8) 3-deoxy-D-manno-octulosonic acid transferase (KDO transferase, waaA (gene), kdtA (gene), 3-deoxy-D-manno-oct-2-ulosonic acid transferase, 3-deoxy-manno-octulosonic acid transferase) is an enzyme with systematic name CMP-3-deoxy-D-manno-oct-2-ulosonate:(KDO)2-lipid IVA 3-deoxy-D-manno-oct-2-ulosonate transferase ((2->8) glycosidic bond-forming). This enzyme catalyses the following chemical reaction

 alpha-Kdo-(2->4)-alpha-Kdo-(2->6)-lipid IVA + CMP-alpha-Kdo  alpha-Kdo-(2->8)-alpha-Kdo-(2->4)-alpha-Kdo-(2->6)-lipid IVA + CMP

The enzymes from Chlamydia transfer three or more 3-deoxy-D-manno-oct-2-ulosonate residues and generate genus-specific epitopes.

References

External links 

EC 2.4.99